Odisha Power Generation Corporation Limited (OPGC) is the only thermal power generating company owned by the Government of Odisha. It was incorporated under the Companies Act 1956 on 14 November 1984. OPGC started as a solely owned Government Company of the state of Odisha. It owns and operates four units of power plant- 2 units of 210 MW each and 2 units of 660 MW, each totaling a generation capacity of 1740 MW of power at Ib Thermal Power Station (ITPS), Banharpali in Jharsuguda District of Odisha. The generation from these units is committed to GRIDCO on the basis of a long-term Power Purchase Agreement.

With the divestment of 49% of the equity shares in favor of AES Corporation, in early 1999, the ownership structure of OPGC became unique of its kind in the country. Following the withdrawal of AES from OPGC in December 2020, Govt. of Odisha bought back the 49% equity held by AES through another State-owned entity Odisha Hydro Power Corporation Limited (OHPC). Thus, OPGC became a fully owned company of the Govt. of Odisha once again.

In 1990, OPGC started construction of 7 Mini Hydel Projects in different locations of Odisha for the generation of pollution-free power by utilizing canal falls to meet the increasing demand for power with major funding from MNES and IREDA. The details are as follows:

Operational highlights

OPGC Expansion Project
On 1 March 2019 Chief Minister Naveen Patnaik inaugurated OPGC's expansion project, which consists of two units of 660 MW each (total 1320 MW), and coal mines operated by Odisha Coal and Power Ltd. (OCPL), dedicated to the coal requirement of the two new units. The contract was awarded to M/s Bharat Heavy Electricals Limited (BHEL) for the supply of Main Plant, and to M/s BGRE for balance of plant.

75% of power to be generated from the capacity addition has been tied up with GRIDCO under a long term power purchase agreement. Financing agreement executed with Power Finance Corporation and Rural Electrification Corporation for the financing of 75% debt. Two captive coal mines (namely Manoharpur and Dip-side of Manoharpur) allocated to Odisha Coal and Power Limited for the supply of coal to OPGC are in an advanced stage of development, along with the dedicated railway line (MGR) of 47 km for transporting the coal from the mine to the power plant. The land acquisition process for railway line and coal mine have been significantly advanced and the Stage-1 clearance has been obtained from the Ministry of Environment and Forest, Government of India for Forest Diversion for coal mine and MGR alignment.

The power plant will depend on coal from the captive coal mine allocated to Odisha Coal and Power Limited. The Coal from the coal mines of Odisha Coal and Power Limited shall be transported through the dedicated railway line to OPGC for commissioning and operation of the expansion power project thereafter.

In addition to Units 3&4, based on the coal reserves available from the captive mines, OPGC is in a position to pursue Units 5&6 of 2x660 MW (1320 MW) at the same location, which is proposed to be pursued after awarding for the commencement of construction is placed for units 3&4.

References

External links
 

Electric-generation companies of India
Energy in Odisha
State electricity agencies of India
State agencies of Odisha
Energy companies established in 1984
Non-renewable resource companies established in 1984
Indian companies established in 1984
Companies based in Bhubaneswar
1984 establishments in Orissa